The 2001 Nabisco Championship was a women's professional golf tournament, held March 22–25 at Mission Hills Country Club in Rancho Mirage, California. This was the thirtieth edition of the Kraft Nabisco Championship, and the nineteenth as a major championship.

Annika Sörenstam shot a final round 69 to win the first of her three titles at this event, three strokes ahead of five runners-up; it was the third of her ten major titles. She won eight times on tour in 2001 and this was the third in a streak of four consecutive; she successfully defended this title the following year.

Past champions in the field

Made the cut

Source:

Missed the cut

Source:

Final leaderboard
Sunday, March 25, 2001

Source:

Amateurs: Lorena Ochoa (+2), Aree Song (+12), Naree Song (+12).

References

External links
Golf Observer leaderboard

Chevron Championship
Golf in California
Sports competitions in California
Nabisco Dinah Shore
Nabisco Championship
Nabisco Dinah Shore
Kraft Nabisco Championship
Women's sports in California